Everyday Elegance is an American lifestyle television program hosted by Colin Cowie.

Overview
Television program hosted by lifestyle guru and party planner Colin Cowie about ideas on home entertaining, decorating, cooking and style.

References

External links

American television talk shows
1990s American cooking television series
English-language television shows
1999 American television series debuts